Alice Holland, Countess of Kent (c. 1350 – 17 March 1416), LG, formerly Lady Alice FitzAlan, was an English noblewoman, a daughter of the 10th Earl of Arundel, and the wife of the 2nd Earl of Kent, the half-brother of King Richard II. As the maternal grandmother of Anne de Mortimer, she was an ancestor of King Edward IV and King Richard III, as well as King Henry VII and the Tudor dynasty through her daughter Margaret Holland. She was also the maternal grandmother of Joan Beaufort, Queen of Scots.

She was appointed a Lady of the Garter in 1388.

Family
Lady Alice FitzAlan was born circa 1350 at Arundel Castle in Sussex, England, the second daughter of the 10th Earl of Arundel, and Lady Eleanor of Lancaster. She had six siblings who included Richard FitzAlan, later 11th Earl of Arundel, and Lady Joan FitzAlan, later Countess of Hereford, Essex, and Northampton. She also had three half-siblings from her parents' previous marriages.

Her paternal grandparents were the 9th Earl of Arundel and Alice de Warenne, and her maternal grandparents were the 3rd Earl of Lancaster and Maud Chaworth.

Marriage and issue 
In 1354, at the age of four, Lady Alice was betrothed to her father's ward Edmund Mortimer who would in 1360 become the 3rd Earl of March. The marriage however did not take place. Alice married instead on 10 April 1364, 2nd Earl of Kent, one of the half-brothers of the future King Richard II by his mother Joan of Kent's first marriage to Thomas Lord Holland. She received from her father a marriage portion of 4000 marks. Upon her marriage, she was styled Lady Holland. She did not, however, become Countess of Kent until 1381, when her husband succeeded his father as Thomas Holland, 2nd Earl of Kent.

Lord Holland was appointed captain of the English forces in Aquitaine in 1366, and in 1375, he was made a Knight of the Garter. Two years later in 1377, his half-brother Richard succeeded to the throne of England, as King Richard II. Alice's husband would become one of the young King's chief counsellors and exert a strong influence over his brother which led to the enrichment of Thomas and Alice. Alice was appointed a Lady of the Garter, an order of chivalry, in 1388.

Together Thomas and Alice had ten children:
 Alianore Holland (13 October 1370 – October 1405), married firstly Roger Mortimer, 4th Earl of March, by whom she had issue, including Anne Mortimer and Edmund Mortimer, 5th Earl of March; she married secondly Edward Charleton, 5th Baron Cherleton, by whom she had two daughters.
 Thomas Holland, 1st Duke of Surrey and 3rd Earl of Kent (1374 – 7 January 1400), married Lady Joan Stafford, a daughter of Hugh de Stafford, 2nd Earl of Stafford and Philippa de Beauchamp, but the marriage was childless.
 John Holland (died young)
 Richard Holland (died young)
 Elizabeth Holland (died 4 January 1423), married Sir John Neville, Lord Neville by whom she had issue.
 Joan Holland (1380 – 12 April 1434), married firstly as his second wife, Edmund of Langley, 1st Duke of York; married secondly William Willoughby, 5th Baron Willoughby de Eresby; married thirdly Henry le Scrope, 3rd Baron Scrope of Masham, her fourth husband was Sir Henry Bromflete, 1st Lord Vessy. All her marriages were childless.
 Edmund Holland, 4th Earl of Kent (6 January 1384 – 15 September 1408), married Lucia Visconti (1372 – 14 April 1424), but the marriage was childless. He fathered an illegitimate daughter Eleanor de Holland (born 1406), by his mistress Constance of York.
 Margaret Holland (1385 – 30 December 1439), married firstly John Beaufort, 1st Earl of Somerset, by whom she had issue including John Beaufort, 1st Duke of Somerset and Joan Beaufort, Queen of Scotland; she married secondly Thomas of Lancaster, 1st Duke of Clarence.
 Eleanor Holland (1386 – after 1413), married Thomas Montacute, 4th Earl of Salisbury, by whom she had one daughter, Alice Montacute, 5th Countess of Salisbury.
 Bridget Holland (died before 1416), a nun at Barking Abbey.

Later years 

Alice's husband died on 25 April 1397. In 1399, King Richard was deposed, and the throne was usurped by Henry IV, the son-in-law of her elder sister, Joan. In January 1400, Alice's eldest son Thomas, who had succeeded his father as the 3rd Earl of Kent, was captured at Cirencester and beheaded without a trial by a mob of angry citizens| as a consequence of having been one of the chief conspirators in the Epiphany Rising. The rebels had hoped to seize and murder King Henry, and immediately restore King Richard to the throne. Less than three years earlier, her brother Richard FitzAlan, 11th Earl of Arundel and a Lord Appellant had been executed for his opposition to King Richard.

Alice herself died on 17 March 1416 at the age of sixty-six years.

Descendants 
Alice had many illustrious descendants which included English kings Edward IV, Richard III (and his consort Queen Anne), and Henry VII, from the latter of whom descended the Tudor monarchs. Alice was also an ancestress of Scottish king James II of Scotland and his successors, which included Mary, Queen of Scots and James I of England. Her other notable descendants include the last queen consort of Henry VIII, Catherine Parr; Richard Neville, 16th Earl of Warwick known in history as Warwick the Kingmaker; Cecily Bonville; Isabel Ingoldisthorpe, wife of John Neville, 1st Marquess of Montagu; John Tiptoft, 1st Earl of Worcester, and Anne Bourchier, 7th Baroness Bourchier. Living descendants of Lady Alice FitzAlan include the current British Royal Family.

Ancestry

References

External links
 Inquisition Post Mortem #608-631.

1350 births
1416 deaths
Year of birth uncertain
English countesses
Ladies of the Garter
Daughters of British earls
People from Arundel
Alice
15th-century English people
15th-century English women
14th-century English people
14th-century English women
Wives of knights